The Glenard Estate, Eaglemont, is a residential estate designed by Walter Burley Griffin (1876-1937) and Marion Mahony Griffin (1871-1961) in 1915.  They were commissioned by grazier, Peter Keam to lay out the estate on land he owned after his initial commission to lay out the neighbouring Mount Eagle Estate the previous year. The Glenard Estate is the second earliest garden suburban subdivision designed by the Griffins in Australia, predating Castlecrag in Sydney (1924) by nine years.

The estate of 120 lots encompasses Glenard Drive, Mossman Drive, and sections of Lower Heidelberg Road and The Boulevard in Eaglemont, Victoria. The initial sale of the lots was considered a success. The streets follow the site contours with internal reserves provided for community use. These reserves, together with the recommended un-fenced back gardens were intended to provide common playing space for children. Covenants have largely ensured the survival of the original street lay out and internal reserves. The entire estate is listed on the Victorian Heritage Register.

Heritage listings 

 Glenard Estate, Eaglemont
 Pholiota, 23 Glenard Drive Eaglemont (in private ownership)
 Lippincott house, 21 Glenard Drive Eaglemont (in private ownership)

References

External links 
The Glenard Estate and its parks

Garden suburbs
Housing estates in Australia
Heritage-listed buildings in Melbourne
Buildings and structures in the City of Banyule
Planned communities in Australia